KEGX (106.5 FM) is a radio station broadcasting a Classic rock format. Licensed to Richland, Washington, United States, the station serves the Tri-Cities area.  In 2018, KEGX became part of Stephens Media Group.

KEGX owners New Northwest Broadcasters in 2010 defaulted and this station along with the entire Tri-Cities, WA cluster went into receivership. KEGX (and the other stations) continued to operate in that arrangement until Townsquare media announced purchase of the frequency on December 1, 2010. In July 2011 the FCC blocked Townsquare's acquisition of the former New Northwest operation in Kennewick, including KEGX.

On November 6, 2011, the Tri-city Herald reported that a Fargo, N.D., radio owner is paying more than $6 million to purchase 12 stations in the Tri-Cities and Yakima currently owned by New Northwest Broadcasters. Ingstad Radio Washington agreed to purchase — at a discount — more than $16 million in debt owed by Seattle-based New Northwest Broadcasters from a creditor, CIT Group. The Tri-Cities stations included in the sale are: KUJ-FM, a Top-40 hits station; KIOK-FM, a country station; KEGX-FM, a classic rock station; KTCR-AM, talk radio; KKSR-FM, a variety hits station; and KALE-AM, a FOX Sports affiliate. The Yakima stations are: KXDD-FM, a country station; KRSE-FM, a variety hits station; KJOX-AM, an ESPN affiliate; KARY-FM, an oldies station; KBBO-AM, a news radio station and KHHK-FM, a contemporary hit music station. The discounted price for Ingstad is about $6.7 million for all 12 stations.

History
The station went on the air as KHWK on 1982-05-03.  On 1987-04-03, the station changed its call sign to KOTY-FM. On 1993-04-15 to the current KEGX.

As KHWK the station primarily had a country format. A noteworthy short lived incarnation was an attempt to operate a CHR format and directly compete with then KIOK (OK95).

As KOTY-FM it operated with a country format up until 1993 becoming KEGX "Eagle 106.5."

References

External links

EGX